Die Lotosblume ("The Lotus Flower") is a poem written by  Heinrich Heine, and published in his Buch der Lieder (The Book of Songs, 1827). Set to music by Robert Schumann in 1840,  this Lied is part of Schumann's Myrthen collection (op. 25 no. 7)) and Six Songs for Männerchor (op. 33 no. 3).  It is written in the key of F Major, and set in  time. The piece speaks of the blooming of a lotus flower, who hides from the sun and only reveals herself at night to her lover, the moon.  Due to circumstances at the time, the lyrics were intended to have a double meaning. 

When Schumann was courting his future wife Clara, her father was opposed to the relationship. The lotusblume, the sun, and the moon may represent Clara, her father, and Robert Schumann respectively. When the piece begins, there is a heavy octave bass line that may symbolize the father's authority over the relationship. The beginning text is translated to "The lotusflower fears the sun's splendor." Then, when the text "Der Mond, der ist ihr Buhle" or "the moon is her lover" enters, the musical texture changes to a higher register with chord voicing in clusters. Schuman's love for Clara is tender and passionate, and allows her to blossom into her full potential like the lotusblume flower blooms at night.

Text

References

Poetry by Heinrich Heine
1840 poems
1840 compositions
Lieder composed by Robert Schumann
Musical settings of poems by Heinrich Heine